WVSM (1500 AM and 103.1 FM) is a radio station licensed in Rainsville, Alabama and serves Northeast Alabama...including the following counties: Dekalb, parts of Jackson, Cherokee, and Marshall Counties.  The station is owned by Sand Mountain Advertising Co.  It airs a Southern Gospel music format during the day and Contemporary Christian and Praise and Worship at night.

The station has been assigned these call letters by the Federal Communications Commission.

Rejoice 103.1 is now on the air and plays Southern Gospel Music during the day and Contemporary Christian Music at night (This info was extracted from their web site.)

FM Translator
In addition to the main station at 1500 kHz, WVSM is relayed by an FM translator in order to widen its broadcast area, especially during nighttime hours when the AM frequency is off the air.  The FM frequency is used most prominently in the station branding.

References

External links
 WVSM official website

VSM
Southern Gospel radio stations in the United States
Radio stations established in 1967
1967 establishments in Alabama
VSM